The EX-17 Heligun is a double-barrel 7.62 mm calibre machine gun. The weapon is gas-operated and was developed by Hughes Aircraft for use in the OH-6 recon helicopter.

Overview
The Heligun was developed by Hughes Aircraft as part of a complete package for the OH-6 recon helicopter. It offered a number of significant advantages over the M134 Minigun – it weighs less, it was self-powered (not electrically driven),and a 6000RPM firing rate. Ultimately, it was not adopted because the reliability (mean time between stoppages) could not be brought up to par, and US Army officials decided that it did not offer enough improvement over the already adopted M134 Minigun to be worth the switch.

References

7.62×51mm NATO machine guns
Aircraft guns
Multi-barrel machine guns